Harrop Island is a small island lying close to the coast and  northwest of Felton Head, Enderby Land, Antarctica. It was plotted from air photos taken from Australian National Antarctic Research Expeditions aircraft in 1956, and was named by the Antarctic Names Committee of Australia for J.R. Harrop, a weather observer at Wilkes Station in 1960.

See also 
 List of Antarctic and sub-Antarctic islands

References

Islands of Enderby Land